The following is a summary of Galway county football team's 2010 season.

Joe Kernan, the former All-Ireland Senior Football Championship (SFC) winning manager with Armagh, was appointed as Liam Sammon's successor as Galway manager.

Competitions

National Football League Division 1

The league campaign saw Galway come close to relegation. Galway won three and lost four league games. The team defeated Monaghan by a scoreline of 1–20 to 1–14, Tyrone by a scoreline of 1–15 to 0–14 and Dublin by a scoreline of 1–14 to 0–14, but lost to Mayo by a scoreline of 1–10 to 2–14, to Cork by a scoreline of 1–17 to 1–19, to Kerry by a scoreline of 1–9 to 2–16 and to Derry by a scoreline of 1–12 to 2–13.

Connacht Senior Football Championship

Galway narrowly avoided defeat to minnows New York in the 2010 Connacht SFC, emerging with a scoreline of 2–13 to 0-12. The Connacht SFC semi-final against Sligo showed little improvement, and at half-time, Galway trailed Sligo by a scoreline of 1–8 to 0–2. However, Galway managed to salvage an undeserved draw, with an Eoin Concannon goal and a Gareth Bradshaw point levelling the match at 1–10 apiece. Sligo defeated Galway in the replay, by a scoreline of 1–14 to 0-16, knocking Galway into the 2010 All-Ireland SFC qualifiers.

All-Ireland Senior Football Championship

In the 2010 All-Ireland SFC qualifier, Galway met Wexford in a Round 2 game at Pearse Stadium, a week after the Sligo defeat. A 1–11 to 0–13 defeat to Wexford knocked Galway out of the All-Ireland SFC, the team's second consecutive single-point All-Ireland SFC qualifier defeat. Kernan resigned as manager on 4 August 2010, after only one year in charge. Kernan said he felt his position as manager was being "undermined".

References

Galway
Galway county football team seasons